The 2002 Arizona gubernatorial election took place on November 5, 2002. Incumbent Republican Governor Jane Dee Hull was term-limited. The Democratic nominee, Arizona Attorney General Janet Napolitano, narrowly defeated Republican Matt Salmon, a former U.S. Representative. Upon her inauguration, Napolitano became the first woman to succeed another woman as Governor of a state. Until 2022, this was the last gubernatorial election in Arizona in which the margin of victory was single digits.

Republican primary

Candidates
 Betsey Bayless, Secretary of State of Arizona
 Matt Salmon, former U.S. Representative
 Carol Springer, State Treasurer of Arizona

Declined to run 
 Dan Quayle, former Vice President and Indiana Senator

Results

Democratic primary

Candidates
 Alfredo Gutierrez, State Senator
 Janet Napolitano, Attorney General of Arizona and former U.S. Attorney
 Mike Newcomb, physician
 Mark Osterloh, perennial candidate

Results

Libertarian primary

Candidates

Results

General election

Debates
 Complete video of debate, October 30, 2002

Predictions

Polling

Results
The election was extremely close:  Napolitano won by just 11,819 votes out of 1,226,111 cast, the closest gubernatorial election in Arizona in many years. Napolitano also won without carrying Maricopa County. Under Arizonan law, the losing candidate may request a recount, for which that candidate must pay, if the margin of victory is less than one percent but greater than half of one percent.  In 2002, the margin of victory in 2002 was 1.0%, barely allowing a recount.

It soon became apparent that Napolitano had won the election and would be the next Governor of Arizona.  Salmon acknowledged that the chance of his prevailing in a recount was extremely small and decided not to ask for one (recounts seldom see a swing over 1,000 votes ; he was losing by over 10,000).  He officially called Napolitano on November 17 and congratulated her on her victory.

On November 20, Arizona Secretary of State Betsey Bayless certified the results of the election and declared Napolitano the governor-elect.

Notes

References

2002
2002 United States gubernatorial elections
Gubernatorial